Huxel is a locality in the municipality Schmallenberg in the High Sauerland District in North Rhine-Westphalia, Germany.

The river Westernah flows through the village. Huxel borders on the villages of Bad Fredeburg and Holthausen.

The place was mentioned in the 14th century in the records of the Grafschaft Abbey. The village used to belong to the municipality of Oberkirchen in Amt Schmallenberg until the end of 1974.

Gallery

External links 
Holthausen-Huxel.de

References

Villages in North Rhine-Westphalia
Schmallenberg